The Cabinet of Haiti is an executive body of the Republic of Haiti. The Cabinet is the collective decision-making body of the entire government under the Office of the Prime Minister, composed of the Prime Minister and several Cabinet Ministers.

References 

Government of Haiti
Government ministries of Haiti